Osinachi may refer to:

 "Osinachi" — single by Humble Smith
 Osinachi — Nigerian NFT artist.